UFC Fight Night: Rozenstruik vs. Sakai (also known as UFC Fight Night 189, UFC on ESPN+ 47 and UFC Vegas 28) was a mixed martial arts event produced by the Ultimate Fighting Championship that took place on June 5, 2021 UFC Apex facility in Enterprise, Nevada, part of the Las Vegas Metropolitan Area, United States.

Background
A heavyweight bout between Jairzinho Rozenstruik and Augusto Sakai served as the event's headliner.

A women’s strawweight bout between Amanda Ribas and former Invicta FC Strawweight Champion Angela Hill was originally expected to take place at UFC on ESPN: Rodriguez vs. Waterson, but it was postponed due to Ribas testing positive for COVID-19. They were then expected to meet at this event. Two weeks later, the pairing was scrapped once again as Ribas was still suffering from lingering COVID-19 symptoms.

Alessio Di Chirico was expected to face Roman Dolidze in a middleweight bout at the event. However, Di Chirico pulled out of the contest in mid-May due to an injury. He was replaced by Laureano Staropoli.

A middleweight bout between Duško Todorović and Maki Pitolo was expected to take place at this event. However, Pitolo pulled out due to an injury. Todorović faced promotional newcomer Gregory Rodrigues instead.

Nate Landwehr and Makwan Amirkhani were expected to meet in a featherweight contest. Due to an injury, Landwehr pulled out of the bout and was replaced promotional newcomer by Kamuela Kirk.

Maryna Moroz and Manon Fiorot were expected to meet in the women's flyweight division. However, Moroz withdrew from the event due to undisclosed reasons and was replaced by newcomer Tabatha Ricci.

A middleweight bout between Tom Breese and Antônio Arroyo was expected to open the main card, but it was cancelled just before taking place as Breese was dealing with undisclosed medical issues.

Results

Bonus awards 
The following fighters received $50,000 bonuses.
 Fight of the Night: Santiago Ponzinibbio vs. Miguel Baeza
 Performance of the Night: Jairzinho Rozenstruik and Marcin Tybura

See also 

 List of UFC events
 List of current UFC fighters
 2021 in UFC

References 

UFC Fight Night
2021 in mixed martial arts
June 2021 sports events in the United States
2021 in sports in Nevada
Mixed martial arts in Las Vegas
Sports competitions in Las Vegas